The Belarusian Popular Party (Belorusskaia narodnaia partiia, BKP) was a political party in Belarus led by Victor Tereshchenko.

History
Established in 1994, the party contested the 1995 parliamentary elections, winning one seat in the fourth round of voting. When the National Assembly was established in 1996, the party was not given any seats in the House of Representatives.

The party folded in 1999 after failing to re-register.

References

Political parties disestablished in 1999
Defunct political parties in Belarus